Dreams is the debut EP by American metalcore band We Came as Romans. It was released on December 2, 2008 and produced by Joey Sturgis. The songs "Dreams" and "Intentions" were later re-recorded for their 2009 full-length album To Plant a Seed.

Track listing

Personnel
We Came as Romans
 David Stephens - unclean vocals
 Kyle Pavone - clean vocals, keyboards, piano, synthesizer
 Joshua Moore - lead guitar, backing vocals
 Lou Cotton - rhythm guitar
 Andy Glass - bass guitar, backing vocals
 Eric Choi - drums
Production
Produced, engineered, mixed and mastered by Joey Sturgis

References

2008 debut EPs
Equal Vision Records EPs
We Came as Romans albums
Albums produced by Joey Sturgis